Elly Ochola (born 10 May 1983) is a Kenyan boxer. He competed in the men's heavyweight event at the 2020 Summer Olympics.

References

External links
 

1983 births
Living people
Kenyan male boxers
Olympic boxers of Kenya
Boxers at the 2020 Summer Olympics
Place of birth missing (living people)
African Games bronze medalists for Kenya
African Games medalists in boxing
Competitors at the 2019 African Games